André Giroux may refer to:

André Giroux (painter) (1801–1879), French painter and photographer
André Giroux (writer) (1916–1977), Canadian writer and 1949 Montyon Prize winner